Virgin and Child with Two Angels can refer to:

Virgin and Child with Two Angels (Botticelli, Naples)
Virgin and Child with Two Angels (Botticelli, Strasbourg)
Virgin and Child with Two Angels (Cimabue)
Virgin and Child with Two Angels (Verrocchio)
Madonna and Child (Lippi)
Madonna and Child Enthroned with Two Angels by Gentile da Fabriano
Madonna and Child with Two Musician Angels by Correggio